Daniel Clarke (born 4 October 1983) is a British auto racing driver, most recently competing in the Firestone Indy Lights series with Walker Racing, having previously competed in the A1GP World Cup of Motorsport and the Champ Car World Series.

Early career

A veteran of British Formula Ford where he won the prestigious Formula Ford Festival in 2004, he moved up the British Formula 3 Championship in 2005 in a team part owned by Kimi Räikkönen, Räikkönen Robertson Racing, and finished 5th overall, taking the team's first win at Castle Combe and setting the circuit outright lap record which he still holds.

2006 & 2007 – Champ Car and Beyond

With a series of impressive tests he was signed to drive in the Champ Car World Series for CTE Racing-HVM, owned jointly by Cedric the Entertainer and Keith Wiggins, in 2006 as a teammate to the even younger Nelson Philippe. This was despite Danish driver Ronnie Bremer having publicly claimed to have a drive with the team.

He finished 6th at Portland and 7th at Burke Lakefront Airport, where he was battling for 2nd with Mario Domínguez when they collided on the penultimate lap. Dan was again competitive at San Jose, moving up from 9th to 2nd before a gearbox failure put him out at mid-distance. At his next race, in Denver, Clarke moved into 3rd place in the final lap (because of a collision of two drivers ahead of him) to achieve his first podium finish as a Champ Car driver. Indeed, the Denver 3rd place was the first podium finish for a Champ Car Rookie driver in the 2006 racing season.

Following on from Denver, Clarke continued to run at the front and narrowly missed out on another podium finish at the next race in Montreal, Quebec, coming home in 4th place. Immediately after, Clarke won the Bridgestone Pole Position award at Road America, Wisconsin. The first rookie to do so since 2003 and the first British Rookie since Nigel Mansell in 1993. Clarke experienced misfortune towards the end of the season that would see him forced to settle for 'Rookie runner-up' to Will Power after an intense battle between the two drivers.

He returned to the team for the 2007 season, now named Minardi Team USA, joined by new teammate and former Minardi F1 driver Robert Doornbos. Clarke had a troubled season finishing 13th in the overall standings and missing one race, at Zolder having been ejected from the event for causing a multi-car crash in practice. He did however record a second place at Road America.

Upon the folding of the Champ Car series into the IndyCar Series the Minardi team became known as HVM racing and hired E. J. Viso to drive, leaving Clarke without a ride.

2009 – A1 Team Great Britain

He has since driven for Great Britain in the A1GP series, participating in three rounds of the fourth season of the championship.

First announced as the Team GBR driver halfway into the 2008/2009 series at Taupo, New Zealand, Clarke had little time to adapt to the new car, team and track. He went on to build experience through that weekend and then at the Portimão, Portugal, races. The next race for Clarke was Brands Hatch, UK, in front of his home fans. Despite Qualifying technical issues, Clarke put on an impressive performance to drive back from 14th place in the feature to 7th scoring fastest race laps in the process.

Following the weekend, Clarke expressed his gratitude and appreciation for the A1GP Series, Team GBR and British fans' support and his desire to continue with the team through to the 2009/2010 season. However, for the second time in his career, his series folded in the off-season, leaving him without a drive.

2010 – Firestone Indy Lights
In 2010 Clarke signed on with Walker Racing in the Firestone Indy Lights series, the top feeder series to IndyCar. He joined the team at the second race of the season at Barber Motorsports Park. Clarke finished 7th in points with a pair of second-place finishes at Toronto and Mid-Ohio. After a slow start learning the car and working with the team, Dan scored a 4th-place finish in his first outing at the Indianapolis Motor Speedway Freedom 100 and then went on to a successful 2nd half of the season with two 2nd-place finishes at Toronto and Mid-Ohio, five top-5s and 7 top-10s. Finishing up 7th in the series points.

2011
In 2011, Clarke competed in a NASCAR Nationwide Series race at Watkins Glen International, finishing 39th following an engine failure.

2023
Clarke returned to professional racing in 2023, taking part in the Porsche Carrera Cup North America for the Nolasport team.

Motorsports career results

American open-wheel racing results
(key)

Champ Car

Indy Lights

Complete A1 Grand Prix results
(key) (Races in bold indicate pole position) (Races in italics indicate fastest lap)

References

External links
 
 

Living people
1983 births
People from Mexborough
Sportspeople from Doncaster
English racing drivers
Champ Car drivers
Indy Lights drivers
British Formula Three Championship drivers
British Formula Renault 2.0 drivers
A1 Team Great Britain drivers
Formula Ford drivers
NASCAR drivers
A1 Grand Prix drivers
Comtec Racing drivers
Walker Racing drivers
HVM Racing drivers
Double R Racing drivers
Prema Powerteam drivers
Michelin Pilot Challenge drivers